Roberto Romero (October 22, 1927 – February 15, 1992) was an Argentine Justicialist Party politician and businessman.

Romero was a founder of the provincial El Tribuno newspaper. He was elected as Governor of Salta Province, serving from 1983 to 1987, and completing numerous public works aimed at the province's growing tourist industry – notably the DELMI Stadium and the San Bernardo Hill Aerial tramway. He then stepped down to become a national deputy in the Argentine Chamber of Deputies for Salta Province. He stood for governor once again in 1991, but lost and retired that year from public life.

In February 1992, whilst on holiday with his family in Brazil, Romero was killed in an automobile accident. His son, Juan Carlos Romero, later also served as Governor of Salta.

In 2006 it came to light that the Drug Enforcement Administration of the United States had considered Romero the likely head of a major drug cartel.

External links
 Biography

1927 births
1992 deaths
People from Salta
Argentine people of Spanish descent
Members of the Argentine Chamber of Deputies elected in Salta
20th-century Argentine businesspeople
Governors of Salta Province
Justicialist Party politicians
Argentine newspaper founders
Road incident deaths in Brazil